Trevor James Laurence (born 11 June 1952 in Te Aroha, died 31 March 2015 in Paekākāriki) was a New Zealand field hockey player. He competed in the 1984 Summer Olympics in Los Angeles, with the national team, the Black Sticks, which finished seventh.

Work
Founder and Owner of Experiential Training and Coaching (ETC)

External links
 

New Zealand male field hockey players
Olympic field hockey players of New Zealand
Field hockey players at the 1984 Summer Olympics
1952 births
2015 deaths
Sportspeople from Te Aroha